Nejmeh Sporting Club is a football club based in Manara, a district in Ras Beirut, Beirut, Lebanon, that competes in the . The club was established in Beirut in 1945, and received its license in 1947. Nejmeh's board is affiliated with the Future Movement and the Hariri family.

Historically, the club is second only to their cross-city rivals Ansar in the Lebanese Premier League and the Lebanese FA Cup. Nejmeh, however, lead in Lebanese Elite Cup titles. The rivalry between the two clubs has been dubbed the Beirut derby. In Asia, Nejmeh were runners-up in the 2005 AFC Cup, where they lost to Al-Faisaly of Jordan. Furthermore, they won the Al-Adha Cup – an Arab tournament – four times, last time being in 1991.

History

Nejmeh was founded in 1945 by the Druze and Sunni communities from Ras Beirut, Beirut, Lebanon, as an association football club, with Anis Radwan as their first president. This committee applied for a license at the Lebanese Government on 4 March 1947, which was issued on 28 April. The choice of club's name is said to have came on 11 October 1945, when a meeting was held at Radwan's house at night to discuss the affairs of the team. Looking at the sky's stars, Radwan decided to call the team Nejmeh (The Star). The five-pointed star is the Druze's religious symbol. 

On 25 July 1950, Nejmeh won the Lebanese Second Division, but were only officially promoted in 1951, during which Papken Poyajian was appointed president of the club. They first competed in the Lebanese Premier League during the 1953–54 season.

During the 1970s, Pelé and Bebeto, played matches with Nejmeh as honorary guests.

Nejmeh won the FA Cup for the first time in its history on 31 October 1971, when they won 3–1 against Safa. Hani Abdelfattah scored the first goal for Safa at the 17th minute, and Jamal Al Khatib equalized for Nejmeh in the 25th minute. The second half saw Nejmeh score two goals: Hassan Shatila in the 61st minute, and Mahmoud Chatila in the 78th minute. Sarkis Demerjian refereed the game with Amin Al Fata and Harout Avikian as his assistants. The game was a repeat of the 1964 final, which Safa had won; Adnan Hariri scored the sole goal of the game.

Colours and badge
Ever since the club's foundation, the traditional and primary color of Nejmeh has been burgundy red. The club's badge is composed of a star in the center, in reference to the club's name which, in Arabic, means "Star". The two cedars on the side of the logo recall Lebanon's national symbol.

In 2019 the logo underwent various changes: the star changed from white to gold, the cedars from green to burgundy and the text from burgundy to black. Other minor changes have also been made such as the enlargement of the width of the white border, and the shift of the text "Beirut 1945", which moved from the center of the star to underneath it.

Stadium

The Rafic Hariri Stadium is located in Manara area of Beirut, Lebanon. The stadium consists of a football field, and spaces that accommodate around 5,000 spectators, together with a VIP seats area that accommodates around 100 guests, a cafeteria, and a gymnasium.

The old club stadium first consisted of a sand training field over the land number 704 in Ras Beirut area with no facilities or fences. The stadium went through a rehabilitation process, with improvements including implanting the field with grass, increasing the seats spaces to allow more spectators, and enhancing the stadium facilities, walls, and fences. The first phase of the process started in June 2003 and was completed in late March 2004.

On 21 February 2005, the stadium was named "The Martyr Rafic Hariri Stadium" in honour of the late Prime Minister.

Supporters
Founded on 9 February 2018, Nejmeh's "Ultras Supernova" was the first ultras group to be introduced in Lebanon. The name "Supernova" is a reference to the etymology of Nejmeh which, in Arabic, means "Star".

Prior to the Arab Club Champions Cup game against Al-Ahly of Egypt, played on 13 August 2018, seven "Ultras Supernova" fans were arrested by the Egyptian national security because of the negative connotations the word "Ultras" has in Egypt. The fans have been returned to Lebanon by request of the Lebanese Ambassador to Cairo.

During the 2022 FIFA World Cup in Qatar, Nejmeh ultras were employed by the Qatari government to act as Qatar national team fans during their games. The 1,500 "adopted" ultras wore maroon t-shirts with "Qatar" stamped on front, sang the Qatari national anthem and beat drums while singing chants.

Club rivalries

The Beirut derby with Ansar has historically been the most anticipated game in Lebanon: both located in Beirut, Nejmeh and Ansar have shared the majority of titles. While Nejmeh has been more successful in Asia, Ansar holds the most league titles and FA Cups.

In recent years another fierce rivalry has developed, between Nejmeh and Ahed. Also based in Beirut, Ahed have won the majority of league titles since the 2014–15 season. Tensions between the two teams have also forced the federation to change venues multiple times. Most noticeably, in the 2016–17 season, Nejmeh refused to play against Ahed in the league title decider and were sanctioned six points by the federation.

Another rivalry that has developed in recent years is with Salam Zgharta. Since the 2016–17 season, Salam Zgharta and Nejmeh have played various intense games between each other, with some escalating in offensive chants.

Other important matches are with Safa and Racing, both located in the same city as Nejmeh.

Players

Current squad

Notable players

Honours

Domestic

League
Lebanese Premier League
Winners (8): 1972–73, 1974–75, 1999–00, 2001–02, 2003–04, 2004–05, 2008–09, 2013–14
Lebanese Second Division
Winners (1): 1950–51

Cup
Lebanese FA Cup
Winners (7): 1970–71, 1986–87, 1988–89, 1996–97, 1997–98, 2015–16, 2021–22
Runners-up (9): 1950–51, 1963–64, 1995–96, 2002–03, 2003–04, 2011–12, 2014–15, 2017–18, 2020–21
Lebanese Elite Cup
Winners (12; record): 1996, 1998, 2001, 2002, 2003, 2004, 2005, 2014, 2016, 2017, 2018, 2021
Runners-up (2): 1997, 2013
Lebanese Super Cup
Winners (6): 2000, 2002, 2004, 2009, 2014, 2016
Runners-up (5): 1996, 1997, 2005, 2018, 2021

Continental
 AFC Cup
 Runners-up (1): 2005
Arab Club Champions Cup
Runners-up (1): 1981–82

Awards
Best Team in Asia
Winners (1): March 2000

Performance in AFC competitions
In 1982, Nejmeh reached the Arab Club Champions Cup final but lost to Iraqi club Al-Shorta. In 2005, Nejmeh reached the final of the AFC Cup and lost to Al-Faisaly of Jordan: this was the first time a Lebanese football team had reached the final of any Asian competition.

 AFC Champions League: 2 appearances
1996–97: Second round
2002–03: First Round

 AFC Cup: 10 appearances
2004: Quarter-finals
2005: Final
2006: Semi-finals
2007: Semi-finals
2010: Group stage
2014: Round of 16
2015: Group stage
2017: Group stage
2019: Group stage
2022: Group stage

 Asian Cup Winners' Cup: 3 appearances
1990–91: First round
1997–98: First round
1998–99: First round

See also 
 List of football clubs in Lebanon

Footnotes

References

External links

 Nejmeh SC at the AFC
 Nejmeh SC at LebanonFG

 
Football clubs in Lebanon
Association football clubs established in 1945
1945 establishments in Lebanon
Shia Islam in Lebanon
Sunni Islam in Lebanon